Lost Paradise is the debut album by British heavy metal band Paradise Lost. Released in February 1990 by Peaceville Records, it features the band's early death-doom style. The album was re-issued in 2003 and included three bonus tracks.

The tracks "Our Saviour" and "Frozen Illusion" were rerecorded in other Paradise Lost albums Tragic Illusion 25 and Medusa.

Track listing

Personnel

Paradise Lost
 Nick Holmes – vocals
 Gregor Mackintosh – lead guitar
 Aaron Aedy – rhythm guitar
 Stephen Edmondson – bass
 Matthew Archer – drums

Production
 Duncan Fegredo – cover art
 Paul "Hammy" Halmshaw – producer
 Pat Grogan – engineering
 Porl Medlock – photography
 Kay Field – female vocals

Credits

The album was recorded at The Academy in winter 1989. It was engineered by Pat Grogan and produced by Hammy. Female vocals on "Breeding Fear" were performed by Kay Field. Kay Field appears courtesy of Major Records. The song "Internal Torment II" also appears on the Peaceville Records compilation Vile Vibes.

All Songs composed by Holmes/Mackintosh and Published by Vile Music (Zomba Music Publishers Ltd.). The cover illustration was done by Duncan Fegredo of Exploding Head Designs in 1989. Photography was done by Porl A. Medlock.

References

Paradise Lost (band) albums
1990 debut albums
Peaceville Records albums